is a series of Japanese light novels written by Ryō Suzukaze and illustrated by THORES Shibamoto. The three novels were published in 2011 and 2012.  The series is a prequel to Hajime Isayama's Attack on Titan manga series.

A manga adaptation by Satoshi Shiki was serialized between 2013 and 2019.

Plot
The series is set 70 years before the events of Attack on Titan, and is divided into two parts: the first focuses on Angel Aaltonen, the developer of the Vertical Maneuvering Equipment; the second part follows the life of Kuklo, a boy who was found as a baby in a pile of Titan vomit, having been birthed by one of the Titan's victims after they were eaten.  He is labelled the "Titan's son" and imprisoned for many of his younger years, before being freed by his owner's daughter, Sharle, and eventually joining the Survey Corps.

Media

Light novel
The series of light novels is written by Ryō Suzukaze, with illustrations by THORES Shibamoto.  Three volumes were released between 2011 and 2012.  It serves as a prequel to the Attack on Titan manga series, written and illustrated by Hajime Isayama.

The series was licensed in North America by Vertical, who published the first volume in summer 2014, followed by the second and third volumes in a 2-in-1 omnibus format in summer 2015.
Attack on Titan: Before the Fall first volume is named Attack on Titan: Before the Fall, second volume is Marching Giants and the third volume is Kuklo Unbound. The English version combines volumes 2 and 3 into Kuklo Unbound.

Volume list

Manga
A manga adaptation, written by Suzukaze and illustrated by Satoshi Shiki, was published in Kodansha's Monthly Shōnen Sirius magazine from August 26, 2013 to March 26, 2019 and was collected in seventeen volumes. The series received a special chapter in the May issue of Monthly Shōnen Sirius on March 25, 2014.

Kodansha USA announced in October 2013 that it had licensed the series, and released it in North America from March 2014 to August 2019.

Volume list

Reception
The manga had 1.4 million copies in print in August 2015.

A number of volumes of the manga have made it onto The New York Times manga best-sellers list:
 Volume one was on the list for five non-consecutive weeks: for the first two weeks it ranked at number one.
 Volume two was on the list for one week at fifth place.
 Volume three was on the list for one week at fourth place.
 Volume four was on the list for two weeks, ranking at fourth and eighth place, respectively.
 Volume seven was on the list for one week, ranking at fourth place.

Reviewing the first novel for Anime News Network, Rebecca Silverman called it "well-written, engrossing, and with the feel of historical fiction rather than fantasy".  She wrote that "Suzukaze's writing style is very visual, the prose can make your stomach churn and hair stand on end, not so much in a straight horror way, but more in the sense of a nightmare coming true when you had convinced yourself that it was just a dream."  She concluded by saying "If you are not tired of Attack on Titan or perhaps just want a boost to flagging interest, Before the Fall is absolutely worth reading", and gave the book a grade of A−.  Reviewing the second, omnibus volume, she also gave it a grade of A−, calling the book "an exciting read that requires little prior knowledge of the Attack on Titan world."  She concluded her review by saying that the story "gives us what the original manga does in novel form, and there really is not much higher praise that an adaptation can get than that."

References

External links
  at Kodansha USA
 

2011 Japanese novels
Before The Fall
Kodansha books
Kodansha manga
Kodansha Ranobe Bunko
Light novels
Prequel novels
Shōnen manga
Vertical (publisher) titles